Driven is a 2001 American action sports film directed by Renny Harlin and starring Sylvester Stallone, who also wrote and produced. It centers on a young racing driver's effort to win the CART FedEx Championship Series auto racing championship. Prior to production, Stallone was seen at many Formula One races, but he was unable to procure enough information about the category due to the secrecy with which teams protect their cars, so he decided to base the film on Champ Car.

Driven received generally negative reviews from critics, and was a commercial failure.

Plot

Halfway through the fictionalized 2000 Champ Car Season, rookie driver Jimmy Bly has already won five races. His brother/business manager Demille seems more concerned with working out endorsement deals and press engagements than racing, putting tremendous pressure upon Jimmy. His success has also drawn the ire of the reigning champion and series points leader Beau Brandenburg, who believes he's not doing as well as he should because of his fiancée Sophia becoming "a distraction". Brandenburg breaks up their engagement and he regains his winning streak at Chicago Motor Speedway.

As Brandenburg returns to form, Jimmy's paraplegic team owner Carl Henry is concerned that he is making more driving errors. He sees parallels to his former driver and Champ Car Champion, Joe Tanto, whom he convinces to come out of retirement to mentor Jimmy. Joe agrees and is brought in to replace Jimmy's teammate, Memo Moreno. To complicate matters, Joe's ex-wife Cathy Heguy is now married to Memo, the driver that Joe replaced. Despite all this, Joe and Memo are still friends. Demille takes a dislike to Joe's mentoring, implying that Joe should just act as a blocker.

Joe's comeback race in Canada is extremely close, with Jimmy leading and Brandenburg a close second. Jimmy can't seem to pull away from him, so Carl orders Joe to pit and holds him there until the leaders are about to come by, despite Joe's protests. At the last second, Joe leaves the pit just in time to block out Brandenburg, allowing Jimmy to win the race. At the same time, Jimmy starts to form a bond with Sophia, and they start hanging out together; their bond grows further when they travel to Japan, where the next race is held. Joe urges Brandenburg to reconcile with Sophia, while Jimmy's growing bond with Sophia causes him to further lose his form on the track during the next race and results in him crashing out.

At a party in Chicago, where the prototypes of next year's cars are being introduced, Brandenburg and Sophia reconcile, much to Jimmy's disappointment. Sophia apologizes to Jimmy, but he angrily lashes out at her and Brandenburg, then takes one of the new cars and races it out of the convention center. Joe hops into another of the new cars and chases Jimmy down the streets of Chicago, eventually calming him down and bringing him back to his senses after they stop driving. In the coming race in Germany, Carl decides that bringing back Joe isn't getting the results he wants, so he reinstates Memo while making Joe mentor Jimmy from the pit lane.

The next race begins in the middle of the rain, with Jimmy and Brandenburg once again fighting it out for first. Jimmy needs one more win to take the championship, and Memo is instructed to block for him and keep out of his way. However, Cathy convinces Memo to go for the win, and as a result, he collides with Jimmy in a horrific crash that sends him flying into a lake on the far end of the course. Jimmy and Brandenburg dive into the lake and rescue Memo just as a burning tree collapses onto the burning car and ignites the leaking fuel, causing an explosion. This event causes Brandenburg to warm up to Jimmy, telling him he's a good man.

Carl, angered by Jimmy's decision to rescue Moreno instead of fighting on for the championship, decides to replace him with Brandenburg for the coming season and negotiates a deal with Demille, who will now represent Brandenburg. Demille tries to get Brandenburg to sign the new contract, but Brandenburg refuses the deal; Sophia punches Demille in the face for the way he treated her previously. Initially, Jimmy is barred from competing due to a foot injury he sustained during the rescue, but Carl finally decides to clear him for the race after he passes Carl's strength test, and Jimmy thanks both Sophia and Brandenburg for refusing his brother's deal.

At the final race of the year in Detroit, Jimmy and Brandenburg are contenders for the championship. With Memo now hospitalized, Joe is racing again as Jimmy's teammate. In the final laps, Joe takes the lead but damages his front suspension by avoiding a crash. He can no longer contend for the win and the two leaders pass him on the final lap. Jimmy starts to have a mental lapse, but upon hearing Joe's words of wisdom, he pulls ahead of Brandenburg by just a few inches, while Joe's spinning car crosses in third. In front of a large crowd of spectators, including Sophia and Demille, who finally shows he is proud of his brother, Jimmy is named the new champion and he celebrates his victory with Joe and Brandenburg.

Cast

Montoya, Gugelmin, and Blundell lent their car and helmet likeness to Brandenburg, Tanto and Bly respectively, Blundell's helmet being suitably changed from an "MB" logo to "JB". Team Penske with 2 drivers Hélio Castroneves, Gil De Ferran and team owner Roger Penske was originally to be featured on the film but they removed them for unknown reasons.

Production

Development and writing
Stallone became interested in the world of racing while making Judge Dredd in Europe, and decided to make a film with that backdrop. He had originally intended to make a film based on Formula One, attending the 1997 Italian Grand Prix and stating his goal in a press conference. However, the plan was subsequently dropped.

Stallone said he wrote about twenty-five drafts.
And of those, about 20 were about this one man's journey, myself, through this film, and all his trials and tribulations. He'd fallen from a great height career-wise. He was a drunkard with all these problems and accidents because he and his wife Cathy, who's played by Gina Gershon, had this very tumultuous relationship. (Laughs) I'm giving you a little biographical hint here. And he just started to come apart. So he was brought back as kind of like how people should never be. It's like taking kids who are truants and then taking them to prison to see where they'll end up and scaring them straight. So I was brought back to basically prove to young Jimmy Bly how he should never be, as a bad example. And then the more we worked on it, it became the dark side, a little seedy, and I didn't know where the upside of it was ever going to be. So we began to reduce his role and make it more of an ensemble, so he's just there as a guy who did his job, wasn't very spectacular, would race like hell, sometimes he'd win, sometimes lose, but he had a certain work ethic code, that old school that could be applied to Jimmy. So that all made it more ensemble, and then in the editing we reduced it even more. I originally had a relationship going with the reporter. But that began to de-emphasise the other people, so we put that on the back burner... So we did shoot it but it we said, "Nah, it's not really flying."
Stallone said the film was autobiographical in a lot of ways.
Racing's very much like the world of acting. You have your front runners and you have guys that are there for the long race, and you have other guys that block for other people, that are called supporting and character actors. It's all the same kind of situation. And you realize that you can't always be No. 1. You just can't be the guy in front all the time. So what you can do is lend support to, and help and nourish and encourage someone else. So it's like your experiences live on in someone else. If you can find some young actor and you can say, 'Listen, don't do this and don't do that and avoid this and that,' and share your experiences, and he does succeed, you can say, 'You know what, I kind of contributed to that.' As an actor did you have to learn you can't always be No.1 the hard way? (Laughs) Unfortuantely I did
Stallone says it took four years to get the finance to make the film.

Stallone and Harlin had previously worked together on Cliffhanger. Harlin had been trying to develop a film on the life of Ayrton Senna and when that fell through signed on to make Driven.

Filming
The film was shot primarily in Toronto, Canada, from 6 July 2000 until 12 October 2000, as well as at a variety of worldwide races which were sanctioned by CART. The German race was filmed at the Continental test track in Hanover rather than the Lausitzring oval.

When Sylvester Stallone's character arrives at a race early in the film, there's a long shot of him walking in, saying hello to various people. One very brief uncredited cameo contains Dustin Hoffman, in racing gear.

Post-production
Matt Hullum of Rooster Teeth Productions fame was the visual effects producer.

The film premiere took place at Grauman's Chinese Theatre, with several CART competitors driving and demonstrating pit stops in modified Champ Cars down Hollywood Blvd.

According to director Harlin's commentary, his first cut was four hours long. Only 51 minutes of deleted footage was included as special feature on DVD.

Reception

Box office
Driven was a commercial failure, and grossed only $32 million against a $72 million budget. This poor performance ended a modestly successful recovery (with 1999 film Deep Blue Sea and 1996 film The Long Kiss Goodnight) from director Harlin's critical and financial failure Cutthroat Island. However, it was Stallone's first #1 opening film since Cop Land.

Critical response
On Rotten Tomatoes, the film has a 14% score based on 111 reviews, with an average rating of 3.60/10. The site's consensus states: "Underdeveloped characters, silly plot dynamics, and obvious CG effects." On Metacritic it has a score of 29 out of 100 rating based on 26 critics, indicating "generally unfavorable reviews". Audiences polled by CinemaScore gave the film an average grade of "B−" on an A+ to F scale.

Roger Ebert of the Chicago Sun-Times said Harlin "has made better pictures [...] but delivers the goods here". Ebert is critical of the editing, the lack of character conflict and the all too happy ending. He gave it  2.5 out of 4.
Entertainment Weekly's Owen Gleiberman called it "Mostly preposterous, and it has no dramatic center, but the racing scenes hold you in their death-trip grip" and gave it a grade C+.
Kenneth Turan of the Los Angeles Times wrote: "Harlin's skill compensates for a lot of narrative preposterousness, even it is overmatched this time around."

When Jay Leno appeared as a guest critic on the television show Ebert & Roeper, both Leno and Richard Roeper described Driven as the worst car film ever made, and a terrible depiction of auto racing. 
Stallone has said he regrets making the film.

Accolades
The film earned seven nominations at the 22nd Golden Raspberry Awards, including Worst Picture, Worst Director, Worst Screenplay, Worst Screen Couple (Reynolds and Stallone) and twice for Worst Supporting Actor (Reynolds and Stallone), with Estella Warren winning Worst Supporting Actress (also for Planet of the Apes).

Other media

Video game
A video game Driven based on the film was released in 2001 for the Game Boy Advance, Nintendo GameCube, and PlayStation 2.

References

External links

 
 
 
 
 

2001 films
2000s English-language films
2000s German-language films
2000s Spanish-language films
2001 action drama films
American action drama films
Canadian action drama films
Australian action drama films
American auto racing films
Films directed by Renny Harlin
Films scored by BT (musician)
Films shot in California
Films shot in Florida
Films shot in Illinois
Films shot in Japan
Films shot in Michigan
Films shot in Toronto
Films shot in Vancouver
Films with screenplays by Sylvester Stallone
Warner Bros. films
Franchise Pictures films
Films shot in Detroit
Films produced by Elie Samaha
Golden Raspberry Award winning films
Auto racing mass media
2000s American films
2000s Canadian films